Cyclidia fabiolaria is a moth in the family Drepanidae. It was described by Oberthür in 1884. It is found in China (Tibet).

References

Moths described in 1884
Cyclidiinae